Mark Velzeboer (born 29 October 1968) is a Dutch short track speed skater. He competed in the men's 1000 metres event at the 1992 Winter Olympics.

References

External links
 

1968 births
Living people
Dutch male short track speed skaters
Olympic short track speed skaters of the Netherlands
Short track speed skaters at the 1992 Winter Olympics
Sportspeople from South Holland
20th-century Dutch people